Millerstown is an unincorporated community in eastern Johnson Township, Champaign County, Ohio, United States. Nettle Creek, a tributary of the Mad River, flows past Millerstown.

History
Millerstown was platted in 1837. The community was named for early landowner Casper Miller. A post office was established at Millerstown in 1838, and remained in operation until 1903.

References

Unincorporated communities in Champaign County, Ohio
Unincorporated communities in Ohio
Populated places established in 1837
1837 establishments in Ohio